BTV  is a Lithuanian television station, established in 1993. BTV broadcasts 24 hours a day and has its headquarters in Vilnius. The program includes entertainment, information and educational programs, films and productions. BTV cover 80% of Lithuania's territory.

On May 30, 2002, the channel was shut down when its frequencies were taken by TV4, but two years later, it was relaunched on September 17, 2004.

In 2018–19, the corporate identity was changed.

Series 
 Sled (Russian series, Detective)
 Сериал Пес (Russian series, Detective)
 Highlander (France, Canada)

Shows 
 Betsafe LKL (Lithuanian)

 Gyvenu čia (Lithuanian)

News 
 INFO DIENA

References

External links
www.btv.lt

Television channels in Lithuania
Television channels and stations established in 1993
Television channels and stations disestablished in 2002
Television channels and stations established in 2004
1993 establishments in Lithuania
2002 disestablishments in Lithuania
2004 establishments in Lithuania